iZotope, Inc. is an audio technology company based in Cambridge, Massachusetts, United States.  iZotope develops professional audio software for audio recording, mixing, broadcast, sound design, and mastering which can be used in wide range of digital audio workstation (DAW) programs. In addition, iZotope creates and licenses audio DSP technology including noise reduction, sample rate conversion, dithering, time stretching, and audio enhancement to hardware and software companies in the consumer and pro audio industries.

Software

Mobile applications

Spire — iOS recording app (released July 24, 2015)
iDrum and iDrum Mobile (acquired on December 4, 2006) — virtual drum machine
Music and Speech Cleaner — audio cleanup and enhancement suite
Sonifi — mobile remix mobile application developed by Sonik Architects
The T-Pain Effect (released July 20, 2011) — beat and vocal recording software with pitch correction

Third-party plugins

Ozone Maximizer Rack Extension (released June 14, 2012)  for Reason — Reason 6.5 Rack Extension
Mastering Essentials (released January 20, 2012) for Acoustica Mixcraft Pro Studio 6
Radius (released May 19, 2006) — world-class time stretching and pitch shifting for Logic Pro and SoundTrack Pro

Discontinued products

Ozone MP — analog modeled audio enhancement for Winamp and Windows Media Player
 pHATmatik PRO — loop-based sampler
PhotonShow — photo slideshow software
PhotonTV —  photo slideshow software
 Spectron (released March 6, 2003) — 64-bit spectral effects processor

Compatible software
iZotope's software can be used with Pro Tools, Logic Pro, GarageBand, Cubase, Nuendo,  WaveLab, Studio One, Adobe Audition, Reaper, FL Studio, Ableton Live, Reason etc. iZotope is compatible with most software that use VST or VST3 files.

Hardware
iZotope introduced an iPhone-driven physical recording device, branded Spire Studio. The small, portable device works wirelessly with iZotope's Spire iOS app and includes 4GB of storage and an internal microphone, as well as audio inputs for connecting external instruments or microphones. Spire Studio is targeted to musicians, small bands, and home recordists, as well as the podcasting and meeting sectors.

Licensing

iZotope licenses its software and technology licensing, offering development of technology for Mac and Windows platforms, mobile, video game, and embedded DSP. Clients have included Sony, Adobe, Xbox, Harmonix, Smule, Sonoma Wire Works, and most recently, Blue Microphones. Algorithms are delivered as a plugin or SDK for easy implementation. To date, iZotope technology has shipped in nearly 68 million products worldwide.

Licensed technologies

Mac/PC 
iZotope has audio technology readily available in the form of VST, DirectX, AudioUnits, RTAS or AudioSuite plug-ins. Typical uses for licensed technology for Mac or PC applications include audio finalizing, music production, audio for video, presentation audio, metering to address broadcast loudness standards, and media playback. Categories of available licensed technologies include audio enhancement, voice enhancement, audio repair tools, creative tools, DJ tools, audiophile tools, time manipulation and audio for video.

Video Games
iZotope has developed plugins for use directly in Audiokinetic WWise for audio enhancement, voice effects occlusion and room modeling. In addition, iZotope has developed sound design tools and special effects for sound designers using the FMOD middleware engine. For middleware engines supporting XAudio and Multistream formats, iZotope has a collection of licensable DSP for use in music related games or karaoke.

Mobile SDKs
Core FX
Audio Repair
DJ FX
Vocal FX
Trash FX
Fun FX

Embedded
Noise reduction DSP is available for use in hardware using Analog Devices SHARC and Blackfin processors. In 2012, iZotope embedded Adaptive Noise Reduction and Keyboard Click Reduction technologies on Blue Microphones' Tiki USB Mic.

Other
 Omega — realtime time and pitch control
 Radius — natural time stretching technology. Integrated into Digidesign's Pro Tools Elastic Time as well as Cakewalk SONAR. Available as a plug-in for Apple Logic Pro.
SRC — 64-bit sample rate conversion.

Notable licensing partners

Artist references 
 Musician Andrew Katz of Car Seat Headrest mentions using Ozone on 1 Trait Danger's cover of CAKE's "Friend is a Four Letter Word".
 iZotope receives credit from Trent Reznor and Nine Inch Nails on the album credits of Year Zero.
 American record producer Just Blaze mentions using Ozone on his latest project with Jay-Z.
Rock band from the US Garbage refers using Stutter Edit, Ozone, and Trash.
American DJ Skrillex discusses about using Ozone on his tracks.

Awards and accolades

Emmy Award Technology & Engineering Emmy (2013) — RX 2

 The Cinema Audio Society Outstanding Product Post Production (2021) — RX

References

Further reading

External links
 Official website

Companies based in Cambridge, Massachusetts
Software companies based in Massachusetts
Manufacturers of professional audio equipment
Audio equipment manufacturers of the United States
Software companies of the United States